Xiong Li (reigned 11th century BC) was an early ruler of the state of Chu during the early Zhou Dynasty of ancient China.  He succeeded his father Yuxiong, who was the teacher of King Wen of Zhou, the first king of Zhou.  Xiong Li's ancestral surname was Mi, but he adopted the second character of his father's name – Xiong, literally "bear" – as the royal clan name of Chu, which is now the 72nd most common surname in China.

Xiong Li was succeeded by his son, Xiong Kuang, and his grandson Xiong Yi would later be enfeoffed by King Cheng of Zhou and granted the hereditary noble rank of viscount.

References

Monarchs of Chu (state)
11th-century BC Chinese monarchs
Year of birth unknown
Year of death unknown